Vitez is a town and municipality located in Central Bosnia Canton of the Federation of Bosnia and Herzegovina, an entity of Bosnia and Herzegovina. According to the 2013 census, the town has a population of 6,329 inhabitants, with 25,836 inhabitants in the municipality.

Etymology
The word vitez means knight in Bosnian and Croatian and Serbian and Hungarian.

History

Vitez was part of Bosnia until the decay of Bosnia when Ottoman Empire occupied this region. This was the period in Vitez got its name. It is known that the first settlement in nowadays urban area was formed around the mosque, built in 1590. Knowing that mosques are being erected in urban areas, it is logical to say that this settlement existed even before. Vitez is mentioned once again during an uprising against Turks led by Husein Gradaščević, when he defeated Turkish Army at Kosovo, after which he was named for Bosnian de facto ruler (Vezir). According to the Austrian officer Božića (1785), Vitez had 18 houses, mosque and Motel (Han).

After many centuries under the Ottoman rule, 1878 Bosnia and Herzegovina, and Vitez got occupied by Austro-Hungary Monarchy, and later 1908 annexed. During this time there were many changes in Bosnian society, both political and economical. For a short period they built many roads, railroads, mines,... But, unluckily only with goal to exploit Bosnian natural resources. At the place of old Turkish wood plant, Austrian entrepreneur Guido Rütgers built the enterprise for mechanical wood processing which was a milestone in a development of urban area. In 1879, Vitez had 510 inhabitants. Other companies existed as well, but were all owned by foreigners. It this period many people from parts of Monarchy came to work in Vitez, especially from Slovenia, Croatia, Czechoslovakia, Hungary, Switzerland.

Demographics

Sport
The town is home to the football club NK Vitez, basketball club HKK Vitez Paladij, handball club R.K. Vitez, table tennis clubs STK Vitez and STK CM Vitez, and rugby league club Vitez RLC.

Notable people
Davor Badrov, singer
Sasha Skenderija, poet
Zlatan Bajramović, footballer
Vejsil Varupa, footballer
Ante Rajković, footballer
Roberto Soldić, MMA fighter

References

External links 

 

 
Cities and towns in the Federation of Bosnia and Herzegovina
Municipalities of the Central Bosnia Canton